Jason Henry Hitz (born 20 February 1980) is a former Zimbabwean cricketer. He was a right-handed batsman and a right-arm medium-fast bowler who played for Matabeleland. He was born in Bulawayo.

Hitz made three appearances during the Logan Cup competition of 1999/2000, debuting against Manicaland. Batting as a tailender, 24 of Hitz's 28 career runs came in the same innings, against Mashonaland.

Hitz took four wickets in 27 overs of bowling.

Hitz later played rugby union in the United Kingdom, at Aldeburgh & Thorpeness Rugby Club, in Aldeburgh, Suffolk, making eight appearances in the 2013/14 season.

References

External links
Jason Hitz at Cricket Archive

1980 births
Living people
Zimbabwean cricketers
Matabeleland cricketers